The 2017 Samoa Honours and Awards were appointments made by the O le Ao o le Malo of Samoa, Tui Atua Tupua Tamasese Efi,  to various Orders, decorations, and medals of Samoa under the Honours and Awards Act 1999. The investiture ceremony was held on 3 February 2017. Following this ceremony no awards were made for six years.

The recipients of honours are displayed here as they were styled before their new honour.

Order of Merit of Samoa (OM)
 Mase Toia Alama
 Lupesoliai Joseph Parker

Order of Samoa

Officers
 Hans Kruse
 Namulauulu Galumalemana Schmidt

Members
 Leilua Galuvao Dr. Faaalii Aloaina

Head of State's Service Medal
 Lafaitele Aiga Poasa Tupae Esera
 Tuliafiafi Toafa Togai'u Li'o
 Mulitalo June Kolotita Oloalii
 Afemata Tunumafono Apelu Aiavao
 Fuaolefau-Le- Pouli Soonalote Naseri
 Maria Muagututi’a Sefo
 John Desmond Luff

References

Orders, decorations, and medals of Samoa
2017 awards